Dead to the World is a 1991 Australian film.

It premiered at the 1991 Melbourne International Film Festival.

Plot
The owner of an inner city boxing gym and her troupe of boxers band together to fight developers.

References

External links

Dead to the World at Australian Screen Online

Australian action drama films
1991 films
1990s English-language films
1990s Australian films